Andrés Andrade (born December 14, 1998) is an Ecuadorian tennis player.

Andrade has a career high ATP singles ranking of 559 achieved on November 21, 2022. He also has a career high ATP doubles ranking of 452 achieved on January 30, 2023.

Andrade represents Ecuador at the Davis Cup, where he has a W/L record of 0–1. Andrade also played college tennis at the University of Florida.

Tour finals

Singles

Doubles

References

External links

1998 births
Living people
Ecuadorian male tennis players
American male tennis players
Sportspeople from Guayaquil
Florida Gators men's tennis players